James George Leckie (9 October 1903 – 25 June 1982) was a New Zealand track and field athlete who won a bronze medal at the 1938 British Empire Games.

Early life and family
Born at Blueskin Bay, north of Dunedin, on 9 October 1903, Leckie was the son of William Gunn Leckie and Helen Cameron Leckie (née Farquharson). He married Daisy Isabella McIntyre on 22 August 1934, and they went on to have three children.

Athletics
Leckie was a four-time winner of the New Zealand hammer throw title at the national amateur athletics championships, in 1932, 1945, 1946, and 1948.

Selected to represent New Zealand at the 1938 British Empire Games in Sydney, Leckie was his team's flagbearer at the opening ceremony. Leckie was also entered for the men's discus, but did not start.

Twelve years later at the 1950 British Empire Games in Auckland, Leckie was the New Zealand team captain.

Later life and death
During World War II, Leckie was a member of the Home Guard, and was appointed as a temporary second lieutenant in February 1943. In civilian life, he was a schoolteacher, and was headmaster at Sawyers Bay School.

Leckie died in Dunedin on 25 June 1982.

References

1903 births
1982 deaths
Athletes from Dunedin
New Zealand male hammer throwers
Athletes (track and field) at the 1938 British Empire Games
Athletes (track and field) at the 1950 British Empire Games
Commonwealth Games bronze medallists for New Zealand
Commonwealth Games medallists in athletics
New Zealand military personnel of World War II
New Zealand schoolteachers
Medallists at the 1938 British Empire Games